The 1882 Scottish Cup Final was the ninth final of the Scottish Cup and the final of the 1881–82 Scottish Cup, the most prestigious knockout football competition in Scotland. The original match - which ended in a 2–2 draw - was played at the original Cathkin Park in Crosshill (today part of Glasgow) on 18 March 1882 and was watched by a crowd of 12,000 spectators. For the second season in succession, the final was contested by defending champions Queen's Park and Dumbarton.

The replay took place at the same venue on 1 April 1882 in front of 15,000 spectators. Queen's Park won the competition for the sixth time after they beat Dumbarton 4–1.

Background
Two-time defending champions Queen's Park had reached the final on five previous occasions and had gone on to win the competition each time – including the last two consecutively. Prior to the final, Queen's Park's total of five Scottish Cup wins was a record and both Queen's Park and Vale of Leven had won the cup three times in-a-row.

Dumbarton reached the final for the second consecutive season becoming the first runner-up to reach the final in the following season. Only Queen's Park and Vale of Leven had previously reached the final in consecutive seasons.

This was the first time that the two finalists from the previous season had would meet in the next final. Queen's Park had won both previous Scottish Cup meetings between the two teams – the 1880 semi-final and the 1881 final.

Route to the final

Queen's Park

Dumbarton

Notes

Match details

Original

Replay

External links
London Hearts Scottish Football Reports 18 March 1882
London Hearts Scottish Football Reports 1 April 1882
Queen's Park 2–2 Dumbarton, Saturday, March 18th, 1882, (The Dumbarton Archive)
Dumbarton 1–4 Queen's Park, Saturday, April 1st, 1882, (The Dumbarton Archive)

References

Scottish Cup Finals
Scottish Cup Final 1882
Scottish Cup Final 1882
Cup
19th century in Glasgow
March 1882 sports events
April 1882 sports events